Morten Andersen (born 1976 in Aalborg, Denmark) is a contemporary artist with his own style developed through graffiti to "geometric expressionism" with reflections from cubism and futurism. Andersen is a representative of the new "Urban art" and paints complicated geometric patterns entirely expressed with lines stretched, coloured, and angled with urban energies of his own creation. Andersen has educated himself through travels to Vietnam, China, France, Spain, Egypt and USA. He has exhibited throughout Europe, in USA and Abu Dhabi. In 2011 French Graffiti Art Magazine called him a prominent member of the one hundred contemporary artists to look out for.

Exhibitions 

2013
 Scope Miami Beach, C.A.V.E. Gallery, Venice, California
 Geometry by Chance, Mirus Gallery, San Francisco

2012
 I.D. Gallery, Abu Dhabi
 FUTURISM 2.0, London

2011
 Rudimentary Perfection, Glasgow
 1 Underdog Gallery, London

2010
 MINI Countryman Open Air, Mudchute Park and Farm, London
 Postland, Compound Gallery, Portland, USA
 Art Basel, Art Whino Gallery, Miami

See also 
 List of Danish painters

References 

 Graffiti Art Magazine, April 2012

External links 

Contemporary painters
Living people
1976 births
Danish painters